City Tunnell may refer to:
 City Tunnel (Malmö), a railway tunnel in Sweden
 Cross City Tunnel, a road tunnel in Sydney, Australia
 Frankfurt City Tunnel, a railway tunnel in Germany
 Offenbach City Tunnel, a railway tunnel in Germany
 Leipzig City Tunnel, a railway tunnel in Germany